Windsor Boys' School Boat Club is a rowing club based on the River Thames at 7 Stovell Road, Windsor, Berkshire.

History
On 18 January 1939 the new school site was opened and just one year later in 1940 the Boat Club was founded.

The club was formed by members of Eton Excelsior Rowing Club who wanted to keep their club active during World War II. The club today belongs to The Windsor Boys' School of which rowing is their primary sport. The current boathouse is situated behind the School's playing fields on the River Thames.

The club had produced multiple British champions.

Honours

British champions

Key = J junior, 2, 4, 8 crew size, 18, 16, 15, 14 age group, x sculls, - coxless, + coxed

Henley Royal Regatta

References

Sport in Berkshire
Rowing clubs in England
Rowing clubs of the River Thames
Windsor, Berkshire
Scholastic rowing in the United Kingdom